The Alhambra Orchestra is a community philharmonic based in Miami, Florida. For over 25 years, the orchestra has promoted classical music throughout Miami-Dade County by presenting residents with free concerts throughout the local area.  It has also made an impact on its community by promoting classical music education through outreach programs that include performances for kids in various schools. The orchestra is conducted by Daniel Andai as well as other guest conductors who include Scott Flavin, Peter Fuchs and Timothy Shade.

History 

Founded in 1990 by Leo Walz, the orchestra presents approximately 7 concerts per season and has now performed over 100 free concerts. Consisting of approximately 60 active members, the Alhambra Orchestra is governed by an 11-member board of directors and is funded by government grants, business sponsorship and private donations.

Included in every season is the December joint concert with the Civic Chorale of Greater Miami to perform Handel's Messiah. The orchestra also performs a yearly joint concert with the Greater Miami Youth Symphony. At mid-season, a performance featuring winners of an annual concerto competition is presented. The season ends with an opera performance in collaboration with Riuniti Opera.

Conductors 

1990-2000   Leo Walz
2001-2002   Isaac Chueke
2002-2008   Reginald F. Nicholson
2009–2012   Alfred Gershfeld
2012-2015  Zoe Zeniodi
2015-2016 Timothy Shade
2016–present Daniel Andai

Guest artists 
Ross Harbaugh
Daniel Andai
Zoe Zeniodi
Paul Posnak
Mia Vassilev

References

External links 
 Alhambra Orchestra official website

Orchestras based in Florida
Musical groups from Miami